Cromwell's Act of Grace, or more formally the Act of Pardon and Grace to the People of Scotland, was an Act of the Parliament of England that declared that the people of Scotland (with certain exceptions) were pardoned for any crimes they might have committed during the Wars of the Three Kingdoms. It was proclaimed at the Mercat Cross in Edinburgh on 5May 1654. General George Monck, the English military governor of Scotland, was present in Edinburgh, having arrived the day before for two proclamations also delivered at the Mercat Cross, the first declaring Oliver Cromwell to be the protector of England, Ireland and Scotland, and that Scotland was united with the Commonwealth of England.

Origins
After the English invasion of 1650, and the defeat of the Scottish armies at the battles of Dunbar, Inverkeithing and Worcester, Scotland was placed under English military occupation with General Monck as military governor of the country. Up to the date of the Act of Grace the English army had been able to suppress the Scottish resistance to the occupation with relative ease and the occupation, with sporadic but ineffective resistance, would continue throughout the Interregnum up until the Restoration in 1660.

The Act had its origins in the English written constitution of December 1653, called the Instrument of Government. Between December 1653 and the calling of the First Protectorate Parliament that sat for the first time in September 1654, the Lord Protector Oliver Cromwell and his Council of State were granted under the Instrument of Government the power "to make laws and ordinances for the peace and welfare of these nations where it shall be necessary" and on 12 April 1654 the regime passed a number of ordinances pertaining to the government of Scotland: 
 Ordinance for uniting Scotland into one Commonwealth with England
 Ordinance of Pardon and Grace to the People of Scotland
 Ordinance for erecting Courts Baron in Scotland
 Ordinance for settling the Estates of several excepted Persons in Scotland, in Trustees, to the Uses herein expressed.

Contents
The content of the Act of Grace contained:
A general pardon and act of oblivion,
Except for members of the royal family (their estates were confiscated),
Other excepted who had their estates confiscated,
Other excepted and fined,
Other exceptions and provisions.

General pardon
The first and second paragraphs drew a line under Wars of the Three Kingdoms. Oliver Cromwell, the Lord Protector of the Commonwealth of England, Scotland and Ireland, and the Dominions of those nations, ordained that on 1 May 1654, with the exceptions laid out in paragraphs that followed "in this Ordinance", that the People of Scotland were pardoned for any crimes they might have committed during the preceding wars and that there would be no further financial or other punishments.

The rest of the ordinance proceeded to list the various exceptions to the general pardon and clarification of some of the details.

Except members of the royal family
The third paragraph excepted royal estates and other possessions in Scotland and so allowed for the sequestration by the Commonwealth. The wording also covered royal possessions that might have been passed to others since 1 May 1642.

Except those who had their estates confiscated
The fourth paragraph listed twenty-four men whose estates were excepted and forfeited to the Commonwealth (See Appendix A), and like the Royal estates, this was backdated to cover the estates as they were on 18 April 1648. Also, almost as a post script to the paragraph, a twenty-fifth man, James, 1st Lord Mordington, had his estates of "Maudlain Field, Sunck, Cony-garth, Constables-Batt, Two Watermills, and a Wind-mill lying within Barwick bounds." confiscated.

The next paragraph arranged for the confiscation of the estates of certain categories of Scots who had opposed the English Parliament since 1648 and were still under arms against the English Commonwealth after 3 September 1650 or were not now considered by Oliver Cromwell to be reconciled to the new regime. Those who could be excluded by this paragraph were Scottish MPs who had not signed the Protestation against the invasion of England in 1648, those men who sat in the Scottish Parliament or were a member of the Committee of Estates of Scotland after the coronation of Charles II (in 1651), or were in the Scottish army after the Battle of Dunbar on 3 September 1650 (which included all those who had taken part in the Worcester Campaign).

The following paragraph limited the time creditors had to put in claims against the forfeited estates. Claims had to be lodged with named representatives, within 60 days of the proclamation of the ordinance.

The next three paragraphs granted certain lands to the named wives and children of those whose estates had been confiscated, under the condition that they pay rent to the Protector for those lands and that they renounced any claims they had to other properties which previously belonged to those excluded from the general pardon.

Except those who were fined

Seventy-three men were fined (see Appendix B). The ordinance included details of how the fines were to be paid and what was to happen if the fine was not paid. The money was to be paid to Gilbert [George] Bilton, deputy treasurer at Leith. Half was to be paid on, or by, 2 August 1654 and the other half on, or by, 2 December 1654. If a person defaulted on payment, then their estate was to be confiscated by the commissioners for sequestration.

Other exceptions and provisions

The last few paragraphs of the Ordinance laid on certain points so that it was clear that this Ordinance could not be used to frustrate some other points of law that the drafters of the ordinance saw as potential legal problems.

The Ordinance could not be read as restoring or reviving of any lordship, dominion, jurisdiction, tenure, superiority, or any thing whatsoever, abolished by An Ordinance for Uniting Scotland into one Commonwealth with England.

The general pardon did not extend to those persons in arms since 1 May 1652 who would remain subject to the Articles of War. The general pardon could not be construed to extend, to the freeing or discharging of any prisoners or prisoners of war, from their respective imprisonments or their promises and surety for release from that imprisonment.

The final paragraph negated any reading of the ordinance that might be construed to reduce the revenues that formerly went to the Crown and should now go to the Lord Protector.

Passed by Parliament and consented to by the Lord Protector

Although the ordinance had been issued on 12 April 1654, and then proclaimed in Scotland on 5 May 1654, like the other ordinances pertaining to Scotland issued on 12 April 1654, it did not become enacted until an enabling act, called "Act touching several Acts and Ordinances made since the twentieth of April, 1653, and before the third of September, 1654, and other Acts" was consented to by the Lord Protector on the 26 June 1657, the same day that the enabling bill was approved by the Second Protectorate Parliament.

Appendix A: List of those whose estates were sequestrated 

The following list of prominent opponents of the Commonwealth were exempted from the general pardon and had their estates forfeited:

Appendix B: List of those fined 
The following people were fined:

See also
List of Ordinances and Acts of the Parliament of England, 1642–1660

Notes

References
 126
 Text of Cromwell's Pardon and Grace to the People of Scotland

1654 in law
1654 in England
1654 in Scotland
Oliver Cromwell
17th century in Edinburgh
Pardon legislation
George Monck, 1st Duke of Albemarle